Shiloh is a census-designated place (CDP) in Sumter County, South Carolina, United States.  The population was 259 at the 2000 census. It is included in the Sumter, South Carolina Metropolitan Statistical Area.

Geography
Shiloh is located at  (33.936614, -80.023938).

According to the United States Census Bureau, the CDP has a total area of 9.7 square miles (25.2 km2), of which 9.7 square miles (25.2 km2) is land and 0.04 square mile (0.1 km2) (0.21%) is water.

Demographics

As of the census of 2000, there were 259 people, 84 households, and 66 families residing in the CDP. The population density was 26.6 people per square mile (10.3/km2). There were 94 housing units at an average density of 9.7/sq mi (3.7/km2). The racial makeup of the CDP was 38.61% White, 58.30% African American, 3.09% from other races. Hispanic or Latino of any race were 3.47% of the population.

There were 84 households, out of which 25.0% had children under the age of 18 living with them, 52.4% were married couples living together, 21.4% had a female householder with no husband present, and 21.4% were non-families. 17.9% of all households were made up of individuals, and 8.3% had someone living alone who was 65 years of age or older. The average household size was 3.08 and the average family size was 3.47.

In the CDP, the population was spread out, with 26.6% under the age of 18, 10.4% from 18 to 24, 23.6% from 25 to 44, 22.8% from 45 to 64, and 16.6% who were 65 years of age or older. The median age was 37 years. For every 100 females, there were 87.7 males. For every 100 females age 18 and over, there were 90.0 males.

The median income for a household in the CDP was $26,042, and the median income for a family was $27,321. Males had a median income of $39,205 versus $16,250 for females. The per capita income for the CDP was $15,568. About 9.7% of families and 14.2% of the population were below the poverty line, including 44.0% of those under the age of 18 and none of those ages 65 or older.

References

Census-designated places in Sumter County, South Carolina
Census-designated places in South Carolina